The 999th Light Africa Division (999. leichte Afrika-Division) was a German Army unit formed in Tunisia in early 1943. The basis of the division was the 999th Africa Brigade (999. Afrika-Brigade), formed several months earlier, as a penal military unit. While all members of Nazi punishment units were labeled "criminals", a significant proportion of the brigade's members had been transferred to it for holding, or being perceived to hold, anti-Nazi ideas.  

The division was not fully-formed when Axis forces in North Africa began to collapse. Consequently, the elements of the division that fought in Tunisia generally did so as independent battalions or companies, which suffered high losses (in terms of  casualties and captured) before being withdrawn. Fighting mostly against US Army forces, many members of the division reportedly surrendered their positions to the Americans without a fight.

Afterwards, the severely depleted division was sent to Greece for garrison duties and to conduct "Bandenbekämpfung"; a term which, in Nazi usage, was usually a euphemism for anti-partisan campaigns.

During the deployment to Greece, some members of the division commenced (or recommenced) a range of subversive and/or anti-Nazi activities. The most prominent of these was Falk Harnack, who defected to the Greek resistance and, with other German defectors, formed the Antifaschistische Komitee Freies Deutschland (AKFD; "Anti-Fascist Committee Free Germany"). Another notable member of the AKFD was August Landmesser, who reportedly refused to make the Nazi salute during his military service and had been depicted in such a protest, in a famous photograph.

Commanders
Commanders were:
 Oberst Heinz Karl von Rinkleff – October 1942 to 2 February 1943 (transferred to Russian front after the surrender at Stalingrad)
 Generalleutnant  – 2 February 1943 to 1 April 1943) (KIA 1 April 1943 when his plane was shot down by Luftwaffe fighters en route to Tunis.)
 Generalmajor Ernst-Günther Baade – 2 April 1943 to 13 May 1943)

Organization
Order of battle of Afrika-Brigade 999
 Afrika-Schützen-Regiment (Infantry) 961
 Afrika-Schützen-Regiment 962
 Nachrichten-Kompanie (Communications) 999

Order of battle of 999 Afrika Division
 Stab
 Divisions-Kartenstelle (Maps) 999
 Afrika-Schützen-Regiment 961
 Afrika-Schützen-Regiment 962
 Afrika-Schützen-Regiment 963
 Panzerjäger-Abteilung 999
 Artillerie-Regiment (Artillery) 999
 Pionier-Bataillon (Engineers) 999
 Aufklärungs-Abteilung (Reconnaissance) 999
 Astronomischer Messtrupp (Navigation) 999
 Werkstatt-Kompanie (Laboratory) 999
 Werkstatt-Kompanie 999
 Entgiftungs-Batterie (Detoxification) 999
 Nachschub-Bataillon (Supply) 999
 Schlächterei-Kompanie (Butchers) 999
 Bäckerei-Kompanie (Bakers) 999
 Divisions-Verpflegungsamt (Rations) 999
 Sanitäts-Kompanie (Medical) 999
 Krankenkraftwagen-Zug (Ambulance) 999
 Veterinär-Kompanie (Veterinary) 999
 Feldgendarmerie-Trupp (Military police) 999
 Feldpostamt (Postal) 999

See also 

 36th Waffen Grenadier Division of the SS
 Afrika Korps
 Division (military), Military unit
 Fliegerführer Afrika
 North African Campaign
 Panzer Army Africa
 Strafbattalion - punishment units in the Wehrmacht.
 Wehrmacht divisions in World War II

References 

 Klausch, Hans-Peter (1986) "Die 999er: von der Brigade "Z" zur Afrika-Division 999 : die Bewährungsbataillone und ihr Anteil am antifaschistischen Widerstand". Retrieved December 2, 2015.

External links
militaryhistorynow.com Strafbataillon
Condemned Men – Meet Hitler’s Penal Battalions, 29 July, 2013 
 Strafbataillon 999, by Heinz G. Konsalik, first published January 1, 1962

999
Penal units
999
Military units and formations established in 1942
Military units and formations disestablished in 1943